Elora Aerodrome  is an airport located  south southeast of Elora, Ontario, Canada.

References

Registered aerodromes in Ontario